A customs and monetary union is a type of trade bloc which is composed of a customs union and a currency union. The participant countries have both common external trade policy and share a single currency.

Customs and monetary union is established through trade pact.

List of customs and monetary unions 

 Economic and Monetary Union of the European Union (1999/2002) with the Euro for the Eurozone members
 de facto San Marino – European Union
 de facto Andorra – European Union
 de facto Monaco – European Union
 de facto Switzerland–Liechtenstein
 de facto the OECS Eastern Caribbean Currency Union with the East Caribbean dollar in the CSME (2006)
 Economic and Monetary Community of Central Africa (CEMAC)
 West African Economic and Monetary Union (UEMOA)
 de facto the Common Monetary Area (CMA) in the Southern Africa Customs Union (SACU)

Note: Every economic and monetary union has also a customs and monetary union.

Additionally the autonomous and dependent territories, such as some of the EU member state special territories, are sometimes treated as separate customs territory from their mainland state or have varying arrangements of formal or de facto customs union, common market and currency union (or combinations thereof) with the mainland and in regards to third countries through the trade pacts signed by the mainland state.

Proposed
 2012 East African Community (EAC)
 2018 Common Market for Eastern and Southern Africa (COMESA)
 Economic Community of Central African States (ECCAS)
 Economic Community of West African States (ECOWAS)
 Gulf Cooperation Council
 2023 African Economic Community (AEC)

Notes

Further reading
 

Currency unions
Customs unions